The Women's shot put athletics events for the 2020 Summer Paralympics took place at the Tokyo National Stadium from August 27 to September 4, 2021. A total of 12 events were contested in this discipline.

Schedule

Medal summary
The following is a summary of the medals awarded across all shot put events.

Results

F12
Records

Prior to this competition, the existing world, Paralympic, and area records were as follows:

Results

The final in this classification took place on 3 September 2021, at 9:30:

F20
Records

Prior to this competition, the existing world, Paralympic, and area records were as follows:

Results

The final in this classification took place on 29 August 2021, at 19:00:

F32
Records

Prior to this competition, the existing world, Paralympic, and area records were as follows:

Results

The final in this classification took place on 1 September 2021, at 19:00:

F33
Records

Prior to this competition, the existing world, Paralympic, and area records were as follows:

Results

The final in this classification took place on 2 September 2021, at 19:48:

F34
Records

Prior to this competition, the existing world, Paralympic, and area records were as follows:

Results

The final in this classification took place on 31 August 2021, at 10:26:

F35
Records

Prior to this competition, the existing world, Paralympic, and area records were as follows:

Results

The final in this classification took place on 2 September 2021, at 9:30:

F36
Records

Prior to this competition, the existing world, Paralympic, and area records were as follows:

Results

The final in this classification took place on 1 September 2021, at 19:05:

F37
Records

Prior to this competition, the existing world, Paralympic, and area records were as follows:

Results

The final in this classification took place on 28 August 2021, at 19:21:

F40
Records

Prior to this competition, the existing world, Paralympic, and area records were as follows:

Results

The final in this classification took place on 4 September 2021, at 9:41:

F41
Records

Prior to this competition, the existing world, Paralympic, and area records were as follows:

Results

The final in this classification took place on 27 August 2021, at 10:05:

F54
Records

Prior to this competition, the existing world, Paralympic, and area records were as follows:

Results

The final in this classification took place on 30 August 2021, at 10:29:

F57
Records

Prior to this competition, the existing world, Paralympic, and area records were as follows:

Results

The final in this classification took place on 2 September 2021, at 9:48:

References

Athletics at the 2020 Summer Paralympics
2021 in women's athletics